The 2008–2009 York University strike was a strike by CUPE Local 3903, the union representing contract professors, teaching assistants, and graduate assistants at York University.

The strike 
The strike began on November 6, 2008, and concluded on January 29, 2009, when the provincial parliament legislated the union back to work. The strike lasted for 85 days, making it the longest academic strike in English-speaking Canada to that time, only surpassed by the subsequent 2018 York University strike. 5000 students, including the Schulich School of Business and the Osgoode Hall Law School, were able to return to school a week prior to the end of the strike due to a deal struck by the union and the university. Much of the criticism focused on CUPE 3093 and York University President Mamdouh Shoukri's poor handling of the dispute.

The Union went on strike due to a variety of institutional grievances, including job security for contract professors, elimination of the Non-Academic Student Code of Conduct, creation of whistleblower protection, and fund indexation. On January 20, 2009, CUPE 3903 defeated a forced ratification vote that would have ended the strike. On January 24, Ontario premier Dalton McGuinty announced a rare Sunday recall of the provincial legislature in order to pass back-to-work legislation mandating an immediate end to the strike. On January 29, the York University Labour Disputes Resolution Act was passed in the provincial parliament on a count of 42–8 ending the strike.

Past labour disruptions at York University

Future labour disruptions at York University 

Members of CUPE 3903 held further strikes in 2015 and 2018 at York University after failing to reach an agreement with the university.

See also 
 2018 York University strike

References

York University Strike, 2008-2009
York University Strike, 2008-2009
York University Strike, 2008-2009
Labour disputes led by the Canadian Union of Public Employees
Labour disputes in Ontario
York University
Education strikes
2009 labor disputes and strikes